Myron Penn (born March 17, 1972) was a Democratic member of the Alabama Senate, representing the 28th District from 2002 to November 3, 2010.

Penn received his Bachelor of Arts from the University of Alabama, and his Juris Doctor from the Cumberland School of Law.

Penn opted not to run for reelection to the Alabama Senate in 2010.

References

External links
Alabama State Legislature - Senator Myron Penn official government website
Project Vote Smart - Senator Myron Penn (AL) profile
Follow the Money - Myron Penn
2006 2002 1998 campaign contributions

Alabama state senators
1972 births
Living people
Alabama lawyers